Anna Polavska (born 28 April 1987) is a Ukrainian TV Host, model and beauty pageant titleholder who won the title of Miss Ukraine Universe and represented her country in Miss Universe 2010.

Miss Universe 2010
She represented Ukraine in Miss Universe 2010, placing as 3rd runner-up to Miss Mexico. She became Ukraine's 3rd highest placement in the Miss Universe pageant. Ukraine's highest placement is Olesya Stefanko - Miss Universe 2011 1st runner-up from Odessa and in 2015, Diana Harkusha placed as 2nd runner-up in the 63rd Miss Universe pageant. Poslavska was the only European to place among the final top five.

References

External links
Miss Ukraine Universe Official Website

1987 births
Living people
People from Nova Kakhovka
Miss Universe 2010 contestants
Ukrainian beauty pageant winners